Garreg Lwyd can refer to any of the following:

Garreg Lwyd, a 616-metre (2021') peak in the Black Mountain of South Wales which overlies the village of Brynamman in Carmarthenshire
Garreg Lwyd, a 498-metre (1634') hill near Rhayader in Mid Wales
Garreg Lwyd, a small estate on the outskirts of Gwyddelwern, North Wales.

Garreg Lwyd is of the Welsh language and translates as 'Grey Stone'